Colin Buchanan Sword (January 8, 1845 – June 16, 1902) was a Canadian politician. He served in the Legislative Assembly of British Columbia from 1890 to 1898 from the electoral district of Westminster-Dewdney.

Electoral history 

|- bgcolor="white"
!align="right" colspan=3|Total valid votes
!align="right"|551
!align="right"|100.00%
!align="right"|
|- bgcolor="white"
!align="right" colspan=3|Total rejected ballots
!align="right"|
!align="right"|
!align="right"|
|- bgcolor="white"
!align="right" colspan=3|Turnout
!align="right"|%
!align="right"|
!align="right"|
|}

References

1842 births
1928 deaths
Members of the Legislative Assembly of British Columbia